Logan Beirne is an American entrepreneur, writer, and academic. He teaches at Yale Law School and his debut book, Blood of Tyrants: George Washington and the Forging of the Presidency, won the Colby Award for best military history. He speaks on history and politics at conferences and universities across the United States and appears regularly in the media.

He founded a multinational legal technology company called Matterhorn Transactions, Inc. in 2011 and has since invested in and co-founded additional companies.

Early life and education
Beirne was born in Bronxville, New York and grew up in Milford, Connecticut. His parents, Sheila (former fashion buyer) and Thomas (former businessman and politician), were interested in American history, and would often take young Beirne to history and war reenactments. He is a descendant of US President James Madison, the “Father of the Constitution”.

Beirne was a Fulbright Scholar at Queen's University, where he studied economics. He earned his J.D. degree from Yale Law School, where he received the Edgar M. Cullen Prize for his constitutional scholarship and was awarded an Olin Fellowship to write on presidential power. He studied international business transactions under the direction of Amy Chua, who is known for her memoir, Battle Hymn of the Tiger Mother. In 2009, Beirne was admitted as an attorney to both the New York and Connecticut bars.

Career
He is the Chief Executive Officer of Matterhorn Transactions,  which provides data analytics to thousands of law firms across the US, Canada, and UK, and is a faculty fellow at Yale Law School’s Information Society Project. He teaches Ethics in Markets, Financial Markets and Corporate Law at Yale. He has invested in and co-founded a museum systems company called Collection Harbor and a music software business called Artusi.

After his Fulbright Fellowship at Queen's University, Beirne worked for the private equity arm of GE Capital before entering Yale Law School. While Beirne was still attending law school, he was a summer associate at the law firm Sullivan and Cromwell,  and subsequently worked as an attorney there after graduation. He was also an investment banker at J.P. Morgan & Co.

His first book, Blood of Tyrants: George Washington, the Forging of the Presidency, began as his thesis at Yale Law School. He is represented by literary agents Writers Reps. While doing research for the book, he discovered letters written by Washington in his ancestors' house.  The acclaimed book received significant media attention and was the winner of the 2014 William E. Colby Award.

Beirne has appeared on ABC News, C-SPAN, Fox News, and NPR. He has written for/appeared in The New York Times, The Wall Street Journal, USA Today, The Huffington Post, National Review, Reuters, The New York Post, The Daily News, and The Washington Times.

Publications
Blood of Tyrants: George Washington & the Forging of the Presidency. Encounter Books. 
Snowden’s Benedict Arnold Path at USA Today
American Amazons at New York Post
Military Commissions are American Justice at USA Today
What would George Washington say about the US now? at Fox News
The Brit who stole Independence Day at National Review
When to Pull the Trigger – And When Not To at The Washington Times
The George Washington you never knew at Fox News
Tsarnaev: What would Washington have done? at Reuters

References

External links
The website for Logan Beirne's first book
Matterhorne Transaction website

Living people
American lawyers
Fairfield University Dolan School of Business alumni
Yale Law School alumni
Sullivan & Cromwell people
American chief executives
21st-century American historians
21st-century American male writers
Year of birth missing (living people)
American male non-fiction writers
Fulbright alumni